The Cambridge History of Britain is a series of textbooks published by the Cambridge University Press aimed at first-year undergraduates and above. It covers the history of Britain from c. 500 to the present day in four volumes.
The volumes are:

References

Series of history books
History of Britain